My Friend Cayla was a line of  dolls which uses speech recognition technology in conjunction with an Android or iOS mobile app to recognize the child's speech and have a conversation. The doll uses the internet to search what the child said which then answers with what it collected online. My Friend Cayla was created by Bob Delprincipe, inventor of Cindy Smart and Tekno the Robotic Puppy. The doll is banned in Germany as an illegal surveillance device.

Technology 
Cayla functions by sending microphone inputs to an app on an iOS or Android (operating system) device via Bluetooth. The app then parses the speech into text and uses keywords to search the Internet for a response. The app translates the text back into speech and sends it back to the doll, who answers after around a one-second delay.

Cayla, operated by 3 AA batteries, also has a "personality", with a database containing details of her family, pets, her favorite food, pop star, and film.

The creator of the doll, Bob Delprincipe, says: "She's not a search engine, she's a seven-year-old girl. There are some things she just doesn't know." And he argued that though there had been 'intelligent' toys before, there had never been an Internet-connected doll.

Styles 
Cayla is available in 3 styles: Blonde, Brunette and African American. The UK saw a limited release of a Princess Edition.

Distribution 
My Friend Cayla is distributed by Vivid in the UK. Genesis is the US distributor.

Awards 
The doll was named 2014 Innovative Toy of the Year by the London Toy Industry Association, and was a top 10 toy for all key European retailers this past holiday season. The doll was later sold in the United States market in August 2015.

In 2015 My Friend Cayla won Most Wanted Dolls of 2015 from TTPM (Toys, Tots, Pets & More).

Controversy
Ken Munro of security firm Pen Test Partners claimed he hacked the doll, and demonstrated the hack in BBC World News Tech Tent program. Tim Medin from Counter Hack also hacked the doll by simply using bluetooth to use it as a remote speaker and microphone, which could be used to communicate with children. "Cayla was basically the subject of a tech prank," said Peter Magalhaes, general manager of Cayla manufacturer Genesis.

In February 2017 the German Federal Network Agency notified parents that they were obliged to "destroy" any Cayla in their possession as it constitutes a concealed espionage device violating the German Telecommunications Act. The agency also considers the Bluetooth device as insecure, allowing connections to Cayla's speaker and microphone within a  radius.

The doll has also been criticised by the Norwegian Consumer Council for allowing the use of the collected data from the child's speech for targeted advertisements and other commercial purposes and its sharing with third parties, as well as for hidden advertisements through the doll's positive statements about certain products and services.

In the United States, the Federal Trade Commission is investigating similar complaints over whether My Friend Cayla's upload of child speech constitutes an undue violation of privacy.

The resulting controversy led to the doll's inclusion in the Museum of Failure in Sweden, where similar failed products and services which were either commercial failures or are controversial in their own right are on display. The Spy Museum Berlin also has a Cayla doll on display, the first toy in its collection of various espionage and surveillance devices. The doll was donated by a German mother who found the doll in her daughter's room after hearing about a government order to destroy the dolls following a ban on its sale and possession.

See also
 Surveillance capitalism

References 

2010s toys
Doll brands
Electronic toys
Fashion dolls
Hacking in the 2010s
Internet of things
Privacy of telecommunications
Surveillance scandals
Toy controversies
Toy recalls
Virtual assistants